Gly-Xaa carboxypeptidase (glycine carboxypeptidase, carboxypeptidase a, carboxypeptidase S, peptidase alpha, yeast carboxypeptidase) is an enzyme. This enzyme catalyses the following chemical reaction

 Release of a C-terminal amino acid from a peptide in which glycine is the penultimate amino acid, e.g. Z-Gly!Leu

This enzyme is isolated from yeast.

References

External links 
 

EC 3.4.17